Bérangère Abba (born 22 October 1976) is a French politician of La République En Marche! (LREM) who served as Secretary of State for Biodiversity in the government of Prime Minister Jean Castex from 2020 to 2022. A lingerie shopkeeper, she was elected municipal councillor of Chaumont in 2014. She was a member of the French National Assembly from 2017 until 2020, representing the Haute-Marne's 1st constituency.

Political career
In parliament, Abba served on the Committee on Legal Affairs from 2017 until 2020. In addition to her committee assignments, she was part of the French-Haitian Parliamentary Friendship Group. On 26 July 2020, Abba was appointed as Secretary of State for Biodiversity at the Ministry for the Ecological Transition under minister Barbara Pompili.

Political positions
In May 2018, Abba co-sponsored an initiative in favour of legalizing assisted reproductive technology (ART) for all women (singles, heterosexual couples or lesbian couples). In September 2018, following the appointment of François de Rugy to the government, Abba supported the candidacy of Barbara Pompili as president of the National Assembly.

See also
 2017 French legislative election

References

1976 births
Living people
Deputies of the 15th National Assembly of the French Fifth Republic
People from Chaumont, Haute-Marne
Women government ministers of France
Politicians from Grand Est
La République En Marche! politicians
21st-century French women politicians
Women members of the National Assembly (France)
Aix-Marseille University alumni
French Ministers of the Environment
Members of Parliament for Haute-Marne